Poul Knudsen (born 25 September 1951) is a retired Danish amateur boxer. He participated in the 1972 Olympics in Munich in the middleweight, losing in the quarterfinals to Prince Amartey from Ghana.

Olympic record
Men's Middleweight (– 75 kg)
 First Round — Bye
 Second Round — Defeated William Peets (ISV), 5:0
 Quarterfinals — Lost to Prince Amartey (GHA), 2:3

References

1951 births
Olympic boxers of Denmark
Boxers at the 1972 Summer Olympics
Living people
Middleweight boxers